The Scotland women's national football team represents Scotland in international women's football competitions. Since 1998, the team has been governed by the Scottish Football Association (SFA). Scotland qualified for the FIFA Women's World Cup for the first time in 2019, and qualified for their first UEFA Women's Championship in 2017. As of July 2019, the team was 22nd in the FIFA Women's World Rankings.
Although most national football teams represent a sovereign state, as a member of the United Kingdom's Home Nations, Scotland is permitted by FIFA statutes to maintain its own national side that competes in all major tournaments, with the exception of the Women's Olympic Football Tournament.

History
Church documents recorded women playing football in Carstairs, Lanarkshire, in 1628. Scotland first played a women's international match in May 1881. Women's football struggled for recognition during this early period and was banned by the football authorities in 1921. Club sides who were interested in using their grounds for women's football were subsequently denied permission by the Scottish Football Association (SFA). The sport continued on an unofficial basis until the 1970s, when the ban was lifted. In 1971 UEFA instructed its members to take control of women's football within their territories. The motion was passed 31–1, but Scotland was the only member to vote against it. Football in Scotland has traditionally been seen as a working class and male preserve.

Scotland's first official match, a 3–2 defeat to England, took place in November 1972. The team was managed by Rab Stewart. The 1921 ban on women's football was lifted in 1974, and the SFA assumed direct responsibility for Scottish women's football in 1998. Scotland have participated in most international competitions since the ban was removed.  The team's standing has improved significantly in recent years, reaching an all-time high of 19th place in the FIFA Women's World Rankings in March 2014. They reached their first major tournament finals when they qualified for UEFA Women's Euro 2017.

The team followed this up by qualifying for their first World Cup finals tournament in 2019. Following their qualification, the Scottish Government announced they would provide funding to allow all the players to train full-time in the lead up to the World Cup, a welcome announcement as several players do not play professionally. Their final home match (against Jamaica) before the 2019 World Cup saw a record attendance for the national team of 18,555. Claire Emslie scored Scotland's first World Cup goal, netting in a 2–1 defeat against England on 9 June. After losing their second game, 2–1 against Japan, Scotland needed to win their third game against Argentina to qualify for the last 16 as a third-placed team. They appeared to be heading for qualification when they took a 3–0 lead, but they conceded three late goals to draw 3–3 and exited at the group stage.

Three consecutive 1–0 defeats in qualification (two by Finland and one by Portugal) prevented Scotland from qualifying for UEFA Women's Euro 2022. Head coach Shelley Kerr, who had guided the team to their appearance at the 2019 World Cup, left her position following this failure.

Pedro Martínez Losa was appointed manager in July 2021, ahead of the first 2023 World Cup qualifiers.

Home stadium

The first official match played by the Scotland women's team was hosted by the Ravenscraig Stadium, an athletics facility in Greenock. Until 2020 the team normally played its home games at (men's) club stadiums around the country. Venues used included Fir Park in Motherwell, Tynecastle Park and Easter Road in Edinburgh, and St Mirren Park in Paisley.

Hampden Park in Glasgow is the traditional home of the men's national team and is described by the Scottish Football Association as the National Stadium. A Scotland women's international was played at Hampden for the first time in October 2012, when it hosted the first leg of a European Championship qualifying playoff against Spain. Earlier in 2012, Hampden had hosted matches in the Olympic women's football tournament. In May 2019 the team attracted a record attendance for a women's football match in Scotland, when 18,555 were present at Hampden for a World Cup warm-up friendly with Jamaica. In July 2021 the SFA announced that all of the 2023 FIFA Women's World Cup qualification home matches would be played at Hampden, making it the regular home ground.

Media coverage
Scotland women's internationals have been televised by BBC Alba and broadcast by BBC Radio Scotland. BBC Radio Scotland presenter Tam Cowan was temporarily taken off the air in 2013, after he criticised the use of Fir Park for women's internationals in his Daily Record column. In a November 2013 interview with The Independent newspaper, Laura Montgomery of Glasgow City FC suggested that media coverage of women's football in Scotland often reflected sexist and misogynist attitudes. This is due to a preponderance of "stupid male journalists", according to Montgomery.

Competitive record

World Cup

*Draws include knockout matches decided on penalty kicks.

Olympic Games

At the Olympic Games the International Olympic Committee charter only permit a Great Britain team, representing the whole of the United Kingdom, to compete. As London hosted the 2012 Summer Olympics, a Great Britain team was entered and two Scotland players (Kim Little and Ifeoma Dieke) were selected for the squad.

The FA indicated in June 2013 that they would be prepared to run women's teams at future Olympic tournaments, subject to one of the home nations meeting the qualification criteria (i.e. being one of the top three European nations at the Women's World Cup). Following objections from the Scottish, Welsh and Northern Irish football associations, and a commitment from FIFA that they would not allow entry of a British team unless all four Home Nations agreed, the FA said they would not seek entry into the 2016 tournament.

In October 2018, an agreement was reached between the four associations ahead of the 2020 tournament, and qualification was secured by England reaching the semi-finals of the 2019 World Cup; Kim Little and Caroline Weir were the Scottish players selected for the squad.

European Championship

Unofficial competitions
World Cup
1970: Did not compete
1971: Did not compete
1978: Did not compete
1981: Did not compete
1984: Did not compete
1987: Did not compete
European Competition
1969: Did not participate
1979: Group stage

Other tournaments

*Draws include knockout matches decided on penalty kicks.

Coaching staff

Current staff

Head coaches
 1972–?:  Rab Stewart
 1974:  Elsie Cook
 1979–1985:  John Pollatschek
 1998:  Jim Fleeting
 1998–2004:  Vera Pauw
 2005–2017:  Anna Signeul
 2017–2020:  Shelley Kerr
 2021:  Stuart McLaren (interim)
 2021–:  Pedro Martínez Losa

Players

Current squad
The following players were named in a squad for the 2023 Pinatar Cup.

Caps and goals are current as of 21 February 2023 after the match against Wales.

Recent call-ups
The following players have been selected by Scotland within the past 12 months.

Notes:
  = Withdrew due to injury
  = Preliminary squad
  = Retired from international football

Honoured players

The SFA operates a roll of honour for every female player who has made more than 100 appearances for Scotland. The Scottish Football Museum operates a hall of fame, based at Hampden Park, which is open to players and managers involved in Scottish football. Rose Reilly (2007) and Julie Fleeting (2018) are the only women to be inducted so far. Sportscotland operates the Scottish Sports Hall of Fame, which has inducted some footballers, also including Reilly.

See also
 List of women's national football teams
 Women's association football around the world
 Scotland women's national under-17 football team
 Scottish Women's Premier League

Notes

References

External links
  
 Official website
 FIFA profile

 
European women's national association football teams
1972 establishments in Scotland
1972 establishments in the United Kingdom